Francisco Jambrina Campos (December 3, 1902 – January 21, 1967) was a Spanish-born Mexican film actor.

Selected filmography
 Simón Bolívar (1942)
 Michael Strogoff (1944)
 Twilight (1945)
 Fly Away, Young Man! (1947)
 The Genius (1948)
 Gangster's Kingdom (1948)
 Philip of Jesus (1949)
 The Great Madcap (1949)
 Traces of the Past (1950)
 Women Without Tomorrow (1951)
 Soledad's Shawl (1952)
 The Night Falls (1952)
 The Miracle Roses (1960)
 My Mother Is Guilty (1960)

References

Bibliography 
 Pancho Kohner. Lupita Tovar The Sweetheart of Mexico. Xlibris Corporation, 2011.

External links 
 

1902 births
1967 deaths
Spanish male film actors
Spanish emigrants to Mexico